The Karl-Preusker-Medaille (Karl Preusker Medal) is awarded annually by the German  (German Association of Library & Information) on the Day of Libraries in memory of  (1786–1871) to people and institutions that effectively promote the cultural mission of the library system.

It "is considered to be one of the highest honours in the German library system".

Recipients 

1996 Peter Härtling
1997 Annette Kasper
1998 Christa Spangenberg
1999 Jürgen Heckel
2000 Roswitha Kuhnert
2001 Bettina Windau
2002 Erich Loest
2003 Regina Peeters
2004 Angelika Casper, Spokeswoman for the initiative to save Cologne's school libraries
2005 Birgit Dankert
2006 Paul Raabe
2007 Georg P. Salzmann, book collector
2008 Martin Weskott
2009 Marion Schulz, librarian in Bremen For her services in setting up a database on women writers in Germany after 1945 and for researching the literature of these women authors
2010 no award
2011 Horst Köhler, Federal President
2012 Ranga Yogeshwar
2013 Bernhard Fabian
2014 Thomas Feibel
2015 Konrad Umlauf
 2016 Thomas Beyer
 2017 Claudia Fabian
 2018 Allianz der Wissenschaftsorganisationen
 2019 Hannelore Vogt
 2020 Wikimedia Deutschland
 2021 Aat Vos

References

External links
 

Literary awards of Berlin
1996 establishments in Germany
Awards established in 1996